During antebellum America, a hush harbor was a place where slaves would gather in secret to practice religious traditions.

History

Religion grew to become a highly respected part of slave life. It offered the enslaved hope and reassurance. Slaves were forced to organize and conduct these meetings in secret because the idea of slaves assembling without supervision left the owners in fear. The meetings were held after dark, once field and house chores were completed, and carried on late into the night.

Christianity was the prominent religion of the African Slaves after being transported to the Americas. After being exposed to Christian ideas, the slaves began to understand them more. Slaves discovered promising stories and passages in the Bible that offered hope. The story of Jesus Christ suffering on the cross drew attention because of the similar, harsh treatment they both received. 

The hush harbors served as the location where slaves could combine their African religious traditions with Christianity. It was safe to freely blend the components of each religion in these meetings. The slaves could let go of all their hardships and express their emotions. Here is where Negro spirituals originated. The songs created by slaves were known to contain a double meaning, revealing the ideas of religious salvation and freedom from slavery. The meetings would also include practices such as dance. African shouts and rhythms were also included.

Slaves would suffer punishments had they been caught in a hush harbor meeting. Slave owners were confident that they would compare treatment, working conditions, and punishments, leaving them worried about revolts and riots.  African American churches taught that all people were equal in God's eyes. Instead the African American church focused on the message of equality and hopes for a better future.

William Edward Burghardt Du Bois (W. E. B. Du Bois) studied African-American churches in the early twentieth century. Du Bois asserts that the early years of the Black church during slavery on plantations was influenced by Voodooism. For example, an oral account from an African American in the nineteenth century revealed that African Americans identified as Christian but continued to make and carry mojo bags to church and practiced Hoodoo and Voodoo. As time progressed, many African Americans became more Christian and less influenced by African religions.

References 

African Americans and religion
Afro-American religion
Pre-emancipation African-American history
Slavery in the United States
History of Christianity in the United States
African-American Christianity